Victor Adere (born 2 August 1993), better known as Victor AD, is a Nigerian singer and songwriter. In 2019 He posted a picture of himself on the street of Dubai with the caption “God I still remember this time last year, I had no passport but now Dubai be like backyard" just to recall the journey to success so far.

Biography
Victor Eugenie Adere was born in Kirikiri, Apapa, Lagos State, where he grew up with his family. He is the first of four children. He attended Heritage International School in Lagos and Ekpan Secondary School in Uvwie, Warri metropolitan area.

Victor began his music career in early 2014. He has worked with producers such as Kulboybeat, Kizzybeatz, ID Clef, Mr Nolimitz. Victor AD's first music release was "Jowo"; the song became a theme song for Radio Continental.

In 2017, Victor AD released the single "No Idea". The music video for the song, which was shot and directed by Cinema House Images in late 2018, was endorsed by TV stations in Nigeria.

On 17 June 2018, Victor AD released the single "Wetin We Gain", and was discovered by the management company Longitude Promotions in 2018. The music video for "Wetin We Gain" has garnered more than 9 million views on YouTube.

Awards and nominations
Soundcity MVP Awards Festival: Listener's Choice nominee, 2018
SSMA:  Best Pop Single and Best New Act, 2018
WEA: Street Song of the Year and Next Rated Artiste, 2018
City People Magazine Award: Promising Act of the Year, 2018; Pop Artiste of the Year, 2019
Ghana Meets Naija: Recognition Award, 2018
Ghana 3Music Awards: Best African Act, 2019
The Headies: Best Pop Single and Song of the Year nominations for "Wetin We Gain", 2019; Next Rated nominee, 2019

Discography

Songs

References

External links
Twitter Profile
Clothing Brand - REDEYE Exclusive
Web 1993 births
Living people
Musicians from Warri
21st-century Nigerian musicians
Nigerian male rappers
People from Delta State
21st-century male musicians  Profiles